was a Japanese samurai of the 16th century, who served the Mōri clan. The son of Kunishi Arisuke, Motosuke served as a senior retainer of Mōri Takamoto. Motosuke fought with distinction at the Siege of Koriyama. Later, he was chosen as one of the five bugyō of the Mōri clan.

References

References
 List of short biographies including that of Kunishi (3 Oct. 2007)

1492 births
1592 deaths
Japanese centenarians
Men centenarians
Samurai